Friarstown is a townland in County Westmeath, Ireland. The townland is located in the civil parish of Castletownkindalen. The southern shores of Lough Ennell border the townland to the north, and the townlands of Friarstown and Dalystown are to the east.

References 

Townlands of County Westmeath